Churbek is a village in the Batken Region of Kyrgyzstan. It is part of the Leylek District. Its population was 1,085 in 2021.

Nearby towns and villages include Katrang (11 miles) and Margun (4 miles).

References

External links 

 Satellite map at Maplandia.com

Populated places in Batken Region